Ein besonderes Paar is a German crime television series. 12 episodes were aired on ZDF in 1992, directed by Helmut Förnbacher.

See also
List of German television series

External links
 

German crime television series
1992 German television series debuts
1992 German television series endings
ZDF original programming
German-language television shows